Anchor Island is an island in Dusky Sound in Fiordland.

The island is situated southwest of the much larger Resolution Island in the inlet area of Dusky Sound and surrounded by many smaller islands and contains four small lakes, including Lake Kirirua, the largest lake on an island in Fiordland.

The island is part of the Fiordland National Park and since 2005 is one of few island sanctuaries that are home to the critically endangered kakapo (or night parrot).

Red deer and stoats had been eradicated between 2001 and 2005, and subsequently endangered endemic birds including tieke (saddleback), mohua (yellowhead), kakapo, and New Zealand rock wren have been relocated to the island.

Anchor Island is one of the predator free islands apart of the Fiordland Islands restoration programme, the programmes focus is to eradicate pests and translocate native species.

Kākāpō 
Pukenui is home to the endangered species kākāpō. The first kākāpō were transferred to Pukenui in 2005 after stoat eradication in 2001. These birds are managed by the Kākāpō Recovery Team, which is a part of the New Zealand Department of Conservation.

Pukenui has rimu forest, an important food source for the species.

The first known breeding of kākāpō on Pukenui occurred in 2011, leading to two infertile eggs. Kākāpō breed again on the island for the 2016 and 2019 kākāpō breeding seasons.

In 2020-2021, several kākāpō on the Island were struck with a cloacitis infection; multiple birds were sent to Auckland Zoo for treatment.

As of 23 January 2022, all mature female kākāpō on the island have bred. Nests have been found for 17 of the 21 birds.

See also

 List of islands of New Zealand
 List of islands
 Desert island

References

Uninhabited islands of New Zealand
Islands of Fiordland
Fiordland National Park